Kingston Creek is a small river in San Mateo County, California and is a tributary of San Gregorio Creek. The river is pumped for Irragation. Some crayfish live in the river.

References

See also
List of watercourses in the San Francisco Bay Area

Rivers of San Mateo County, California
Rivers of Northern California